Dampoort is a neighbourhood in the city of Ghent in Belgium.
Nowadays it is mainly known as the location of railway station Gent-Dampoort and a major crossroads. In former times it used to be the eastern gate of the city (poort being Dutch for "gate"). It opened the city towards the region of Waasland (or Land van Waas) and Antwerp.

It is also where the commercial seaport of Ghent links with the inner-city canals. Close to the Dampoort is Portus Ganda, the yachting area of the city, which opened in 2005, at the former confluence of the rivers Schelde and Leie.

The Dampoort neighbourhood is characterised by a bustling mix of people from different origins: Turkish, Afghans, Eastern Europeans, native Belgians, Moroccan and practically any other nationality the city harbours.

See also 
 Campo Santo, Cementerie

Geography of Ghent
Neighbourhoods in Belgium